Fort Harrison Army Airfield  is a military airport near Helena, the capital of Montana. It is part of Fort Harrison which is home to the Montana National Guard.

References

Airports in Montana
United States Army posts